Moran Township may refer to:
 Moran Township, Michigan
 Moran Township, Todd County, Minnesota
 Moran Township, Richland County, North Dakota, in Richland County, North Dakota

Township name disambiguation pages